Season 1880–81 was the sixth season in which Heart of Midlothian competed at a Scottish national level, entering the Scottish Cup for the sixth time.

Overview 
Hearts reached the fifth round of the Scottish Cup losing to Arthurlie.

Hearts reached the third round of the Edinburgh FA Cup losing to city rival Hibs. On the way Hearts recorded their biggest known victory against Anchor winning 21–0.

Results

Scottish Cup

Edinburgh FA Cup

See also
List of Heart of Midlothian F.C. seasons

References 

 Statistical Record 80-81

External links 
 Official Club website

Heart of Midlothian F.C. seasons
Heart